Grant Stoneman (born November 27, 1995) is an American soccer player who plays as a defender for San Diego Loyal in the USL Championship.

References

External links
 
 Profile at Loyola Athletics
 

1995 births
Living people
American soccer players
Association football defenders
Chicago FC United players
Chicago Fire FC draft picks
Lansing Ignite FC players
Loyola Ramblers men's soccer players
Flint City Bucks players
National Premier Soccer League players
People from St. Charles, Illinois
San Diego Loyal SC players
Soccer players from Illinois
Sportspeople from DuPage County, Illinois
Sportspeople from Kane County, Illinois
USL League One players
Wisconsin Badgers men's soccer players